Jonathan Dixon is an American businessman and politician serving as a member of the Kentucky House of Representatives from the 11th district. Elected in November 2020, he assumed office on January 1, 2021.

Background 
Dixon graduated from Henderson County High School in 1999. Outside of politics, Dixon owns a fence company. He was elected to the Kentucky House of Representatives in November 2020 and assumed office on January 1, 2021.

References 

Republican Party members of the Kentucky House of Representatives
Living people
Year of birth missing (living people)